Homomallium is a genus of moss belonging to the family Hypnaceae.

The genus was first described by Wilhelm Philippe Schimper.

The genus has cosmopolitan distribution.

Species include:
 Homomallium adnatum (Hedw.) Broth.
 Homomallium andoi Higuchi, N. Nishim. & S. Inoue
 Homomallium connexum (Cardot) Broth.
 Homomallium gollanii Broth. ex Ando
 Homomallium homalostegium (Müll. Hal.) Paris
 Homomallium incurvatum Loeske, 1907
 Homomallium japonico-adnatum (Broth.) Broth.
 Homomallium leptothallum (Müll. Hal.) Nog.
 Homomallium loriforme (Broth.) Broth.
 Homomallium mexicanum Cardot
 Homomallium pallescens (Hedw.) Loeske
 Homomallium plagiangium (Müll. Hal.) Broth.
 Homomallium reptile (Michx.) Loeske
 Homomallium sharpii Ando & Higuchi
 Homomallium simlaense (Mitt.) Broth.
 Homomallium yuennanense Broth.

References

Hypnaceae
Moss genera